Route 161 is a north/south highway south of the St. Lawrence River in Quebec, Canada. Its current northern terminus is east of the junction of Autoroute 55 in Saint-Wenceslas, and its southern terminus is at the border of Maine in the USA, where it continues as Maine State Route 27.

On July 6, 2013, the route was severed at Lac-Mégantic, Quebec by an oil train derailment.  Ministry of Transport consultants began surveying a site for a new bridge across the Chaudière River in August 2013.

Municipalities along Route 161
 Saint-Augustin-de-Woburn
 Frontenac
 Lac-Mégantic
 Nantes
 Stornoway
 Stratford
 Weedon
 Beaulac-Garthby
 Saints-Martyrs-Canadiens
 Ham-Nord
 Notre-Dame-de-Ham
 Chesterville
 Saint-Christophe d'Arthabaska
 Victoriaville
 Saint-Valère
 Saint-Samuel
 Sainte-Eulalie
 Saint-Wenceslas

See also
 List of Quebec provincial highways

References

External links  
 Interactive Provincial Route Map (Transports Québec) 
 Route 161 on Google Maps

161
Transport in Victoriaville